Montrachet was a French restaurant in Tribeca opened in April 1985 and Drew Nieporent’s first restaurant.  It closed in the summer of 2006.  Within seven weeks of opening, the New York Times gave it a three star rating which it kept for 21 years.

Unlike other “serious French restaurants” of the time, Montrachet was a remodeled industrial space with pipes that were exposed, original plaster ceilings, young staff dressed all in black and a printed menu in English instead of French. Daniel Johnnes’ wine list gave American wines as much focus as French. Wine Spectator honored them with a Grand Award in 1994.

Alumni
Staff who have worked here include Bill Yosses, David Bouley (the original chef), and Debra Ponzek.

Honors and awards
The restaurant won the 1995 James Beard Foundation Award: 1990s for outstanding service and outstanding wine service.

Legacy
Montrachet was described as “a formative restaurant for … American wine lovers” and one of New York City’s most romantic restaurants. After it closed, Wine Spectator said “Montrachet was a TriBeCa trailblazer that opened in 1985, setting the stage and style for downtown Manhattan dining.”

References

1985 establishments in New York City
Defunct French restaurants in the United States
Restaurants in Manhattan
Defunct restaurants in New York City
French restaurants in New York City
James Beard Foundation Award winners